Ghislaine Pierie (13 September 1969 – 27 January 2023) was a Dutch actress, film director, and stage director.

Filmography

Actress
 (1995)
 (1996)
 (1999–2003)
 (2001–2006)
Baantjer (2002)
 (2004)
 (2008)
Moordvrouw (2012)
 (2014)
 (2015)
 (2016)
 (2020)
Goede tijden, slechte tijden (2021)

Director
Nachtegaal & Zonen (2007)
SpangaS (2007)

Theatre

Stage director
Het huis van Belinda (1993)
De Presidentes (1993)

References

1969 births
2023 deaths
Dutch film actresses
Dutch film directors
People from Ede, Netherlands
Dutch television actresses
20th-century Dutch actresses
21st-century Dutch actresses
Dutch women film directors